Palleura is a genus of moths of the family Yponomeutidae.

Species
Palleura nitida - Turner, 1926 

Yponomeutidae